The 2016–17 Asian Le Mans Series was the fifth season of the Automobile Club de l'Ouest's Asian Le Mans Series. It is the fourth 24 Hours of Le Mans-based series created by the ACO, following the American Le Mans Series (since merged with the Rolex Sports Car Series to form the United SportsCar Championship), the European Le Mans Series and the FIA World Endurance Championship. The four event season begun at the Zhuhai International Circuit on 30 October 2016 and ended at Sepang International Circuit in Selangor on 22 January 2017.

Calendar
The 2016–2017 calendar was revealed on 27 January 2016.

Entry list

LMP2

LMP3

CN

GT

Notes

Results
Bold indicates overall winner.

Championship Standings

Championship Race points

Teams Championships

LMP2 Teams Championship

LMP3 Teams Championship

CN Teams Championship

GT Teams Championship

GT Cup Teams Championship

Drivers Championships

LMP2 Drivers Championship

LMP3 Drivers Championship

CN Drivers Championship

GT Drivers Championship

GT Cup Drivers Championship

References

External links
 

Asian Le Mans Series seasons
Asian Le Mans Series
Asian Le Mans Series
Le Mans Series
Le Mans Series